Orsillus is a genus of Palaearctic bugs, in the family Lygaeidae; it is the type genus of the subfamily Orsillinae and tribe Orsillini.  Species are recorded from Europe and includes O. depressus which has become naturalised in the British Isles.

Species
BioLib lists the following:
 Orsillus depressus (Mulsant & Rey, 1852)
 Orsillus maculatus (Fieber, 1861)
 Orsillus pinicanariensis Lindberg, 1953
 Orsillus potanini Linnavuori, 1978
 Orsillus reyi Puton, 1871

References

External Links
British Bugs: Orsillus depressus (retrieved 31 October 2021)

 

Lygaeidae
Hemiptera of Europe
Pentatomomorpha genera
Taxa named by William Dallas